is a Japanese tokusatsu television series. The twelfth installment in the Kamen Rider Series, it was a joint collaboration between Ishimori Productions and Toei, and it was shown on TV Asahi from February 3, 2002 to January 19, 2003. The series marked the franchise's switch from Columbia Music Entertainment to Avex Group, which continues to produce music for the series today. The series aired along with Ninpuu Sentai Hurricaneger.

In 2008, Ryuki was adapted into the American television series Kamen Rider: Dragon Knight, the second American adaptation of a Kamen Rider series after Saban's Masked Rider (1995).

Story

Thirteen  were created for thirteen Kamen Riders. They form contracts with monsters from the mysterious , a parallel dimension opposite to our own in which only the Kamen Riders can exist. The Riders draw on their monsters' strength in exchange for feeding them the life force of the creatures they destroy. The creator of the  has only one rule: that there can be only one Kamen Rider. The others must be killed, and the sole victor will be granted a single wish, which leads to a conflict known as the Rider War.

All over the city, innocent people are being mysteriously abducted, never to be seen again. During his investigations of these incidents, Shinji Kido – an intern at the online news service ORE Journal – discovers one of the Advent Card decks at an apartment where every reflective surface has been covered by a newspaper. He is soon sucked into the Mirror World, discovering the terrifying truth behind the disappearances: people are being pulled through mirrors by the monsters of the Mirror World so that they may feed. He is about to be killed by a powerful dragon named Dragreder when he is saved by a Kamen Rider Knight: Ren Akiyama. Ren seeks to win the Rider War at all costs. He works with a young woman named Yui Kanzaki, who seeks her missing brother: the master of the Rider War, Shiro Kanzaki. Seeing Ren's strength, Shinji enters the Rider War, not for the prize, but so that he may protect innocent people from the threat of the Mirror World, and stop the senseless fighting between the Kamen Riders. With Dragreder as his contract monster, he becomes Kamen Rider Ryuki.

He discovers that some people cannot be saved and that he must sometimes fight to stop the fighting. The extent to which he must go if he wants his deepest wish to come true, and the sacrifices that he must make. In the end, there can be only one Kamen Rider.

Episodes

Movies and specials

13 Riders
 was written by Toshiki Inoue and directed by Ryuta Tasaki. It features the debut of the thirteenth Kamen Rider in the continuity of Ryuki: Verde. This special was first broadcast on TV Asahi on September 19, 2002. It was later released on DVD on July 21, 2003. The DVD also featured information on the characters, an interview with actor Arthur Kuroda, and an "interview" with some of the characters.

This television special is an alternate telling of the Kamen Rider Ryuki story. Shinji Kido's life, working as an employee at ORE Journal, takes a sharp turn after being pulled into the Mirror World by a Mispider. Luckily, he was saved by a Kamen Rider, Ryuki (Koichi Sakakibara, portrayed by Keiichi Wada). However, Sakakibara could no longer go on due to the severity of his injuries and passed his Card Deck to Shinji, allowing him to become the next Ryuki and defeat the monster. After meeting Yui Kanzaki and Ren Akiyama (Kamen Rider Knight), Shinji learns about the conditions of the Rider War, as well as of the other Riders participating. Unable to allow such a game of death to exist like his Rider predecessor, Shinji sets out to convince all the Riders to end the senseless fighting and put an end to the War. His pleas fall upon deaf ears as just about every other Rider (except for the already-defeated Riders Raia and Scissors) sets out to hunt down Shinji and his eventual reluctant ally, Ren. Eventually, Shinji's deck is destroyed and Ren dies, after passing on the deck for Kamen Rider Knight to Shinji. The special has two different endings which were voted on by the viewers via phone at the time of the initial airing: the voted-for-air ending (in which Shinji faces the surviving Riders on his own) and the alternate ending (a resetting of the Rider War).

Episode Final

 is an alternate ending to the series, taking place after the events of episode 46. With only six Riders remaining in the Rider War; Ryuki (Shinji Kido), Knight (Ren Akiyama), Zolda (Shuichi Kitaoka), Ouja (Takeshi Asakura), and Femme (Miho Kirishima); Shiro Kanzaki alerts them to quickly settle the Rider War within three days. One of them must win and become the last survivor before the sixth surviving Rider reveals himself. Amidst the impending chaos of the fight between the Riders, Shinji discovers an unbelievable truth about the relationship between Yui Kanzaki and the Mirror World, as well as discovering the existence of his Mirror World doppelganger, Kamen Rider Ryuga.

Ryuki vs. Kamen Rider Agito
 is the Ryuki Hyper Battle Video. It features Shinji Kido having a dream where he joins up with Kamen Riders Knight, Zolda, and Ouja, all of whom who are acting out-of-character, to fight an evil Kamen Rider Agito in the Mirror World. They are soon joined by the real Kamen Rider Agito who helps defeat his evil doppelganger.

Ultra Super Hero Taisen
A crossover film, titled  featuring the casts of Kamen Rider Ex-Aid, Amazon Riders, Uchu Sentai Kyuranger, and Doubutsu Sentai Zyuohger, was released in Japan on March 25, 2017. This movie also celebrates the 10th anniversary of Kamen Rider Den-O and features the spaceship Andor Genesis from the Xevious game, which is used by the movie's main antagonists, as well as introduces the movie-exclusive Kamen Rider True Brave, played by Kamen Rider Brave's actor Toshiki Seto from Kamen Rider Ex-Aid, and the villain Shocker Great Leader III, played by the singer Diamond Yukai. In addition, individual actors from older Kamen Rider and Super Sentai TV series, Ryohei Odai (Kamen Rider Ryuki), Gaku Matsumoto (Shuriken Sentai Ninninger), Atsushi Maruyama (Zyuden Sentai Kyoryuger), and Hiroya Matsumoto (Tokumei Sentai Go-Busters) reprise their respective roles.

Heisei Generations Forever

A Movie War film, titled  was released on December 22, 2018, featuring the casts of Kamen Rider Zi-O and Kamen Rider Build along with Kamen Rider Den-O. Actor Shunsuke Daitō portrayed the superior Time Jacker Tid, and actor Kenichi Takitō voiced the Imagin Futaros. Aside from Build, actors Toshiki Kashu (Kamen Rider Agito), Takamasa Suga, Masahiro Inoue (Kamen Rider Decade) and Shun Nishime (Kamen Rider Ghost) also voice their respective reprised roles for the film, while Takeru Satoh (Kamen Rider Den-O) only reprised his role to appear. The events of the film take place between episodes 12 to 13 and before episode 21 where Suga returned physically.

Rider Time: Kamen Rider Ryuki

A spin-off web sequel, titled  was announced and released on Video Pass at March 31, 2019 - April 17, 2019, and written by Toshiki Inoue. The storyline is a sequel to the original Ryuki TV series, which features the shocking return of the Mirror World's Rider War. Takamasa Suga, Satoshi Matsuda, Hassei Takano, Satoshi Ichijo, Tomohisa Yuge, Takashi Hagino, and Tsuyoshi Koyama reprise their respective roles, in addition to guest featuring the main actors from the current series airing Kamen Rider Zi-O, So Okuno and Gaku Oshida. It also re-introduces Kamen Rider Abyss from Kamen Rider Decade to the main universe. The theme song is "Go! Now! ~Alive A life neo~" performed by Rica Matsumoto.

Kamen Rider Outsiders
 is a web-exclusive crossver series of Toei Tokusatsu Fan Club between Ex-Aid, Zero-One, 555, Ryuki, Decade, and Saber released on October 16, 2022, which is a direct sequel to the web-exclusive Kamen Rider Genms series.

Movie Battle Royale
 is a crossover film released on December 23, 2022, which mainly stars the casts of Kamen Rider Revice and Geats, while four Riders (Ryuki, Knight and Ouja, including Ryuga) from Ryuki act as supporting casts to commemorate the series' 20th anniversary. Takamasa Suga, Satoshi Matsuda, and Takashi Hagino reprised their respective roles. The film was written by Yuya Takahashi and Hanta Kinoshita and directed by Takayuki Shibasaki.

Production
The Kamen Rider Ryuki trademark was registered by Toei on November 1, 2001.

S.I.C. Hero Saga
Ryuki had two separate S.I.C. Hero Saga side stories published in Monthly Hobby Japan magazine. The second S.I.C. Hero Saga story  is an alternate telling that features Ouja Survive from Advent Calendar and also introduces . Advent Calendar ran from August to December 2004 and World of If ran from June to August 2005.

Advent Calendar chapter titles
 
 
 
 
 

World of If chapter titles

Novel
, written by Toshiki Inoue, is part of a series of spin-off novel adaptions of the Heisei Era Kamen Riders. The novel was released on August 30, 2013.

Video game
A video game based on the series, developed by Digifloyd and published by Bandai, was released in Japan in 2002 for the PlayStation. It is a basic fighting game where all thirteen Riders are playable with all the forms seen in the show, movie, and specials (except for the Alternatives and Ouja's Blank Form, seen in the Episode Final movie). Four of the Contract Monsters (Volcancer, Metalgelas, Destwilder, and Gigazelle), the two Zebraskulls (Iron and Bronze), and Megazelle are also playable.

Cast
 : 
 : 
 : 
 : 
 : 
 : 
 : 
 : 
 : 
 : 
 : 
 : 
 : 
 : 
 : 
 : 
 : 
 : 
 : 
 : 
 , Visor Voice: 
 Slash Visor Voice: 
 Narration: 

Songs
Opening theme
 "Alive A life"
 Lyrics: 
 Composition: 
 Arrangement: Kohei Wada & 
 Artist: 

insert themes
 
 Lyrics: 
 Composition: 
 Arrangement: 
 Artist: 
 Episodes: 1-17, 19-33
 
 Lyrics: Keiko Terada & 
 Composition: 
 Arrangement: RIDER CHIPS
 Artist: RIDER CHIPS featuring 
 Episodes: 18
 "Revolution"
 Lyrics: Yuko Ebine
 Composition & Arrangement: Mikio Sakai
 Artist: Hiroshi Kitadani
 Episodes: 34-37, 39-50, TV Special
 "Lonely Soldier"
 Lyrics: Yuko Ebine
 Composition: Yo Tsuji
 Arrangement: 
 Artist: Ren Akiyama (Satoshi Matsuda)
 Episodes: 38

References

External links

Kamen Rider Ryuki DVD & Blu-ray Box 
Official website for Kamen Rider Outsiders and Kamen Rider Genms 

Ryuki
2002 Japanese television series debuts
2003 Japanese television series endings
Battle royale
Fiction with alternate endings
Japanese fantasy television series
Television shows about death games
Television shows written by Yasuko Kobayashi